Major Dūrgā Malla (1 July 1913 – 25 August 1944) was the first Gorkha soldier from the Indian Gorkhas, Khas ethnic group in Indian National Army (INA) to sacrifice his life for the cause of Indian independence movement.

Early life
Malla was born in July 1913 at Doiwala near Dehradun, into a Khas Thakuri/Chhetri family of Indian Gorkhas. He was the eldest son of Nb Sub Ganga Malla. In 1930, when Mahatma Gandhi was leading the countrymen for independence through Dandi March, Malla was a student in class nine. Though he was young, he caught everybody's attention by his outbursts in public against the British. In 1931, when he was 18 years old, he moved to Dharamshala and got enrolled in 2/1 Gorkha Rifles. His patriotism brought him close to the Indian National Army of Netaji Subhas Chandra Bose.

Contribution
In 1942, Malla joined INA. His devotion to duty coupled with other skills elevated him to the rank of a Major in INA and he was asked to work in the intelligence wing of the INA. When he was collecting information about the enemy camps, he was caught in action at Kohima on 27 March 1944. He was given death sentence by the Court of Trial at Red Fort, New Delhi. However, before the death sentence was finally executed, the authorities tried to coerce Major Durga Malla into admitting to sedition. His wife was brought to the prison cell but Malla did not succumb to the pressure. 

Malla was married to Sharda Malla of Shyam Nagar, Dharamshala in Himachal Pradesh in 1941. Just three days after marriage, Malla was recalled to his headquarters and directed to go abroad. He next met his wife only before his hanging at Delhi District Jail. In 1944, Major Durga Malla was sent to the gallows.

Memory

To honour Malla, a statue donated by Bharatiya Gorkha Parisangh, a national body of Indian Gorkhas, was unveiled at the Parliament House Complex by Prime Minister Manmohan Singh in 2004. Vice President Bhairon Singh Shekhawat, Lok Sabha Speaker Somnath Chatterjee and other dignitaries were present on the occasion. 25 August, the day of his hanging is observed as Balidan Diwas, or Martyrs' Day, by Gorkhas across India. Another statue of Malla was founded at Garidhura village in Darjeeling district.

References

1913 births
1944 deaths
People from Dehradun district
Indian National Army personnel
Indian independence activists from Uttarakhand
Indian Gorkhas
People executed by British India by hanging
Executed Indian people
Military personnel from Uttarakhand
Gurkhas
Executed spies
Military personnel killed in World War II